"Hello" is the second single released by singer-songwriter Poe. When first released, the single was a moderate success but fared much better on the charts when a remix of the song was introduced. The music video, which featured a The Cabinet of Doctor Caligari theme was co-directed by her brother, Mark Z. Danielewski.

Track listing

Original release
 "Hello" (Band Version) 4:13
 "Hello" (Radio Edit) 4:00
 "Hello" (Album Version) 4:30

Remix release
 "Hello" (E-Smoove Funk Mix) 6:24
 "Hello" (Modern Mix) 5:17
 "Hello" (Generator Mix) 8:54
 "Hello" (Generator Beat Down) 5:39
 "Hello" (Edge Factor Mix) 7:58
 "Hello" (Edge Factor Dub) 7:45
 "Hello" (Nevins' Electronica Mix) 5:13
 "Hello" (Tribal Dub) 8:46

Charts

See also
 List of number-one dance singles of 1997 (U.S.)

References

Poe (singer) songs
1996 singles
1996 songs